Ctenium is a genus of African and American plants in the grass family.

 Species

 formerly included
see Dactyloctenium Enteropogon  Tetrapogon 
 Ctenium digitatum - Enteropogon dolichostachyus 
 Ctenium indicum - Tetrapogon tenellus
 Ctenium nukaviense - Dactyloctenium aegyptium 
 Ctenium rupestre - Enteropogon rupestris
 Ctenium sechellense - Enteropogon sechellensis

References

Chloridoideae
Poaceae genera